Aarthi, also known as Harathi is an Indian actress, comedian and television host who works in Tamil films and television dramas. She initially worked as a child artist in the late 1990s, she also appeared in stand-up comedy shows  namely Super10 and Lollu Sabha, before joining the Tamil film industry, she has played roles in Giri (2004), Padikkadavan (2009) and Kutty (2010).

Career
She started her career in Vanna Kanavugal movie when she was only 6 months old. Later  headed by ex chief minister of Tamil Nadu Mr. Mu. Karunanidhi awarded her "Kalaimamani" for her unique style of humorous acting in films. Some of her popular early films included Arul (2004), Giri (2004) and Kundakka Mandakka (2005), in which she collaborated with actor Vadivelu. For her roles in Padikkadavan (2009) and Kutty (2010), she won the Best Female Comedienne awards from Ananda Vikatan for two consecutive years. Subsequently, in 2012, she was described as "Kollywood's most sought after comedienne". During the same year, she was awarded the Tamil Nadu State Film Award for Best Comedian for her work in the film, Paraseega Mannan (2012). She later won appreciation from The Hindu's critic for her appearance in an item number in Vishnuvardhan's Yatchan (2015).

In 2017, Aarthi took part in the Tamil reality television show, Bigg Boss hosted by Kamal Haasan. She was evicted from the show on day 21, but later returned for a fortnight as a guest contestant.

Personal life
Aarthi married fellow comedian Ganeshkar in a ceremony in Guruvayoor during October 2009, before the pair returned to Chennai for a wedding reception. The pair had earlier been dance partners during the reality dance show, Maanada Mayilada.

Selected filmography

Child artiste
Vanna Kanavugal (1987)
En Thangai Kalyani (1988)
Thendral Sudum (1989)
Kavalukku Kettikaran (1990)
Anjali (1990)
Chatriyan (1990)
Comedian
Arul (2004)
Giri (2004)
Maayavi (2005)
Kaatrulla Varai (2005)
Kundakka Mandakka (2005)
Chinna (2005)
Kannamma (2005)
Pattiyal (2006)
Notebook (2006) - Malayalam
Azhagai Irukkirai Bayamai Irukkirathu (2006)
Thirupathi (2006)
Parijatham (2006)
Kusthi (2006)
Sivi (2006)
Nenjirukkum Varai (2006)
Thaamirabharani (2007)
Malaikottai (2007)
Machakaaran (2007)
Kuruvi (2008)
Jayamkondaan (2008)
Souryam (2008) - Telugu
Villu (2009)
Padikkadavan (2009)
Guru En Aalu (2009)
Engal Aasan (2009)
Adada Enna Azhagu (2009)
Karthik Anitha (2009)
Ainthaam Padai (2009)
Thoranai (2009)
Pistha (2009; Telugu)
 Pudhiya Payanam (2009)
Malai Malai  (2009)
Pinju Manasu (2009)
Suriyan Satta Kalloori (2009)
Netru Pol Indru Illai (2009)
Kutty (2010)
Thairiyam (2010)
Veerasekaran (2010)
Guru Sishyan (2010)
Bale Pandiya (2010)
Uthama Puthiran (2010)
Aduthathu (2011)
Kazhugu (2012)
Nuvvekkadunte Nenakkadunta (2012) - Telugu
Thadaiyara Thaakka (2012)
Chaarulatha (2012)
Paraseega Mannan (2012)
Ethir Neechal (2013)
Naan Rajavaga Pogiren (2013)
Sonna Puriyathu (2013)
Chithirayil Nilachoru (2013)
Ya Ya (2013)
Vishnuvardhana (2013) - Kannada
Kandha (2013)
Vanakkam Chennai (2013)
Ingu Kadhal Katrutharapadum (2013)
Inga Enna Solluthu (2014)
Idhu Kathirvelan Kadhal (2014)
Naan Sigappu Manithan (2014)
Vetri Selvan (2014)
Aranmanai (2014)
Money Ratnam (2014) - Malayalam
Kayal (2014)
Killadi (2015)
Sonna Pochu (2015)
Moone Moonu Varthai (2015)
Yatchan (2015)
Kalai Vendhan (2015)
Sowkarpettai (2016)
Aasi (2016)
Girls (2016) - Malayalam
Thiraikku Varadha Kadhai (2016)
Kaththi Sandai (2016)
Enna Thavam Seitheno (2018)
Sandimuni (2020)

Awards

Television

References

External links
 

Indian film actresses
21st-century Indian actresses
Tamil comedians
Indian women comedians
Tamil actresses
Actresses from Chennai
Living people
Actresses in Telugu cinema
Actresses in Tamil cinema
Telugu comedians
Child actresses in Tamil cinema
People from Ooty
Indian child actresses
Bigg Boss (Tamil TV series) contestants
Actresses in Malayalam cinema
Actresses in Tamil television
Year of birth missing (living people)